The Grace City Bridge near Grace City, North Dakota, also known as the James River Bridge, is a Pratt through truss structure that was built in 1925 over the James River.  It was listed on the National Register of Historic Places in 1997.

References

Road bridges on the National Register of Historic Places in North Dakota
Bridges completed in 1925
National Register of Historic Places in Foster County, North Dakota
Pratt truss bridges in the United States
Transportation in Foster County, North Dakota